The Eastern Football Netball League (known previously as the Eastern Districts Football League and later the Eastern Football League) is an Australian rules football league, based in the eastern suburbs of metropolitan Melbourne.

History 
The Eastern Districts Football League was established on 15 February 1962, but its origins can be traced back to the Reporter District Football League established in 1903.

From 1927 until World War 2, the league was known as the Ringwood District Football League. It was known as the Croydon District Football League and the Croydon Mail Football League between World War 2 and 1949. In 1950 the league became known as the Croydon-Ferntree Gully League.

In 1997, the Eastern District Football League and the Knox Junior Football Association united to create the Eastern Football League.

Following a restructure during 2018, the league now consists of five divisions, and 2019 had 45 clubs. Premier and First Division had 10 clubs each, Second and Third Divisions have eight clubs each, and Fourth Division has nine with the admission of Croydon North-MLOC for 2019. After the conclusion of the 2019 season, on 15 October the league announced a re-branding to the Eastern Football Netball League, recognising netball as a key part of the league structure.

On 3 June 2020, the EFNL cancelled its 2020 season due to the COVID-19 pandemic.

With the admission of Beaconsfield and Oakleigh District for 2022, there are now 48 clubs, including 12 in the Premier Division.

Clubs

Men's Premier Division (2023)

Men's Division 1 (2023)

Men's Division 2 (2023)

Men's Division 3 (2023)

Men's Division 4 (2023)

Women's Premier Division (2022)

Women's Division 1 (2022)

Women's Division 2 (2022)

Women's Division 3 (2022)

Women's Division 4 (2022)

Juniors Only Clubs

Clubs Currently in Recess

Premiers

Premiership Table

Premiership Timeline

Division Promotion and Relegation Timeline

Additional Information
1965 - Divisional promotion and relegation began between Division 1 and 2. Clubs such as Scoresby (Division 2 Premiers in 1962, 63, 64, 65) were not promoted despite winning the Division 2 premiership several times and clubs such as Heathmont were not relegated despite having finished last in 1962 and 1964.
1971 - Divisional promotion and relegation began between Division 2 and 3. Olinda (Division 3 Premiers in 1965, 66, 67) and Mount Evelyn (Division 3 Premiers in 1969, 70) won several premierships in a row without promotion and clubs such as Mulgrave (Division 2 Last Place 1968, 69) and Upper Ferntree Gully (Division 2 Last Place 1970, 71) were not relegated despite finishing last for two years in a row.
1986 - Division 4 was added to the league. The last seven teams of the 1985 Division 3 season were relegated to Division 4 for 1986 (Mount Evelyn, Lilydale, Nunawading, South Wantirna, South Waverley Sandown, Blackburn South and Kilsyth), joining Wonga Park who was admitted as a new club.
2019 - With Division 1 becoming Premier Division, Division 2 becoming Division 1 and Division 3 becoming Division 2, the newly created Division 3 comprised the bottom six teams of Division 3 of 2018 (Waverley Blues, Donvale, Ferntree Gully, South Belgrave, Warrandyte and Chirnside Park), as well as the two Grand Finalists of Division 4 of 2018 (Whitehorse Pioneers and Glen Waverley Hawks).

Eastern Football League Premiers (1962-Present)

Five Division Competition (2019–)

Four Division Competition (1986-2018)

Three Division competition (1962-1985)

Former clubs
Balwyn Combined Football Club (1996 only)
Bennettswood Football Club (1968-1986)
Bennettswood-Blackburn South Football Club (1987-1990)
Blackburn South Football Club (1984-1986)
Clayton Football Club (1985-1998), transferred to Southern Football Netball League
Canterbury Football Club (2009-2013), transferred to Victorian Amateur Football Association
East Hawthorn Football Club (1970-1972)
Mount Evelyn Football Club (1962-2001), transferred to Yarra Ranges Football & Netball League
Noble Park Bears Football Club (1989-1996)
Olinda Football Club (1965-1985), transferred to Yarra Ranges Football & Netball League and now known as Olinda-Ferny Creek
Sandown Football Club (1977-1983), also known as South Waverley Sandown (1984–1997) & Southern Cobras (1998-2005), transferred to Southern Football Netball League
Surrey Hills Football Club (1962-1993), merged with East Camberwell to form Surrey Park Football Club
Wandin Football Club (1962-1971), transferred to Yarra Ranges Football & Netball League
Waverley Football Club (1991-1998)
Wonga Park (1986), also known as North Croydon Football Club (1987-1990)
Yarra Glen Football Club (1962-1984), transferred to Yarra Ranges Football & Netball League

References

External links 
 Official Eastern Football League Site
 Eastern Football League Umpire Association Site
 Eastern Football League Fan Web Site

Australian rules football competitions in Victoria (Australia)
 
Sports leagues established in 1962
Netball leagues in Victoria (Australia)